Perivoli may refer to several places in Greece:
 Perivoli, Corfu, a village on Corfu
 Perivoli, Grevena, a municipal unit in Grevena regional unit 
 Perivoli, Karditsa, a village in Karditsa regional unit, part of Argithea
 Perivoli, Phocis, a village in Phocis, part of Vardousia
 Perivoli Domokou, a village in Phthiotis, part of Xyniada
 Perivoli, Phthiotis, a village in Phthiotis, part of Spercheiada

See also
Perivolia (disambiguation)